Niceforonia is a genus of frogs in the family Strabomantidae found in northern South America (from central Peru to Ecuador and Colombia). The name refers to Nicéforo María, Colombian herpetologist.

Taxonomy
the genus Niceforonia was resurrected from the synonymy of Phrynopus by Hedges and colleagues in 2008. No genetic data exist, and Hedges et al. placed it provisionally in the subfamily Strabomantinae along with the genera Phrynopus, Oreobates, and Lynchius with which it shares a synapomorphy. Based on genetic data from these three genera, Padial and colleagues moved them all into the subfamily Holoadeninae in 2014.

Species
The following species are recognised in the genus Niceforonia:
 Niceforonia adenobrachia (Ardila-Robayo, Ruiz-Carranza, and Barrera-Rodriguez, 1996)
 Niceforonia aderca (Lynch, 2003)
 Niceforonia araiodactyla (Duellman and Pramuk, 1999)
 Niceforonia babax (Lynch, 1989)
 Niceforonia brunnea (Lynch, 1975)
 Niceforonia columbiana (Werner, 1899)
 Niceforonia dolops (Lynch and Duellman, 1980)
 Niceforonia elassodiscus (Lynch, 1973)
 Niceforonia fallaciosa (Duellman, 2000)
 Niceforonia latens (Lynch, 1989)
 Niceforonia lucida (Cannatella, 1984)
 Niceforonia mantipus (Boulenger, 1908)
 Niceforonia nana Goin and Cochran, 1963
 Niceforonia nigrovittata (Andersson, 1945)
 Niceforonia peraccai (Lynch, 1975)

Description
The head is narrower than the body and the tympanic membrane is differentiated, but in some species only the tympanic annulus is visible under skin. The dorsum is smooth to weakly tuberculate, whereas the venter is smooth or areolate. The terminal discs on digits are not expanded but usually bear weak circumferential grooves. The terminal phalanges are narrow and T-shaped. Toes III and V are about equal in length (the origin of the name Isodactylus).

References

 
Frogs of South America
Amphibians of South America
Amphibian genera
Taxa named by Doris Mable Cochran